

DCMO (military)

The Deputy Chief Management Officer is a senior military official in the United States Department of Defense who reports directly to the United States Secretary of Defense.

DCMO (technology)

DCMO (Device Capability Management Object) is an Open Mobile Alliance specification that allows a management authority to make use of the functionalities provided by OMA DM v1.2 protocol to remotely manage the device capabilities.
(follow this link: http://www.openmobilealliance.org/Technical/release_program/docs/DCMO/V1_0-20081024-C/OMA-TS-DCMO-V1_0-20081024-C.pdf for more details)

Open Mobile Alliance standards